An iron hydride is a chemical system which contains iron and hydrogen in some associated form.

Because of the common occurrence of those two elements in the universe, possible compounds of hydrogen and iron have attracted attention.  A few molecular compounds have been detected in extreme environments (such as stellar atmospheres) or detected in small amounts at very low temperatures. The two elements form a metallic alloy above  of pressure, that has been advanced as a possible explanation for the low density of Earth's "iron" core. However those compounds are unstable when brought to ambient conditions, and eventually decompose into the separate elements.

Small amounts of hydrogen (up to about 0.08% by weight) are absorbed into iron as it solidifies from molten state. Although the H2 is simply an impurity, its presence can affect the mechanical properties of the material.

Despite the fleeting nature of binary iron hydrides, there are many fairly stable complexes containing iron-hydrogen bonds (and other elements).

Overview

Solid solutions 

Iron and iron-based alloys can form solid solutions with hydrogen, which under extreme pressure may reach stoichiometric proportions, remaining stable even at high temperatures and that is reported to survive for a while under ambient pressure, at temperatures below 150K.

Binary compounds

Molecular compounds 

 Hydridoiron (FeH). This molecule has been detected in the atmosphere of the Sun and some red dwarf stars. It is stable only as a gas, above the boiling point of iron, or as traces in frozen noble gases below 30 K (where it may form complexes with molecular hydrogen, such as FeH·).
 Dihydridoiron. This compound has been obtained only in very rarefied gases or trapped in frozen gases below , and decomposes into the elements on warming. It may form a dimer  and complexes with molecular hydrogen, such as FeH2(H2)2 and FeH2(H2)3.
 What was once believed to be trihydridoiron was later shown to be FeH bound to molecular hydrogen H2.

Polymeric network compounds 

 Iron(I) hydride. It is stable at pressures exceeding 3.5 GPa.
 Iron(II) hydride or ferrous hydride. It is stable at pressures between 45 and 75 GPa.
 Iron(III) hydride or ferric hydride. It is stable at pressures exceeding 65 GPa.
 Iron pentahydride FeH5 is a polyhydride, where there is more hydrogen than expected by valence rules. It is stable under pressures over 85 GPa. It contains alternating sheets of FeH3 and atomic hydrogen.

Iron-hydrogen complexes 

Complexes displaying iron–hydrogen bonds include, for example:
 iron tetracarbonyl hydride FeH2(CO)4, the first such compound to be synthesised (1931).
 FeH2(CO)2[P(OPh)3]2.
 Salts of the  anion, such as magnesium iron hexahydride, produced by treating mixtures of magnesium and iron powders with high pressures of H2.
 Di- and polyiron hydrides, e.g. [HFe2(CO)8]− and the cluster [HFe3(CO)11]−.

Complexes are also known with molecular hydrogen ligands.

Biological occurrence
Methanogens, archaea, bacteria and some unicellular eukaryotes contain hydrogenase enzymes that catalyse metabolic reactions involving free hydrogen, whose active site is an iron atom with Fe–H bonds as well as other ligands.

See also
 Iron–hydrogen alloy

References 

Metal hydrides
Ferrous alloys
I